
Cape Malabata (Ras Malabata, or Rās al-Manār, "Lighthouse Cape") is a cape located about  east of central Tangier, Morocco, facing the Strait of Gibraltar. The cape features a lighthouse and a medieval-style castle that was built in early 20th century.

Tunnel
In 2003, a Strait of Gibraltar crossing was proposed that would have linked Cape Malabata to Punta Paloma in Spain. Years of studies have, however, made no real progress thus far.

See also
 Cape Spartel

References

Citations

Bibliography
 .
 Marny, Dominique; (2005); Cap Malabata; ; 286 pages

Malabata
Tangier
Geography of Tanger-Tetouan-Al Hoceima